Kaposfüred Sport Club is a Hungarian football club, located in Kaposfüred, Kaposvár. Füred is currently playing in lower division, but between 1996 and 2000 they were in the Hungarian 3rd league. They were in the best 16 in the Hungarian National Cup in 1999. The club has a big rivalization with the team of a close village, Toponár SE.

History

Kaposfüred's sport history's first written documents are from 1922. The club's name was "Kaposfüred Sportegyesület", and it had many sections, including cycling, volleyball, athletics, handball, tennis, bowling, and naturally: football. The club has ceased by the time, and it was only re-founded in 1987. This is the current club's founding date. Now, it has only one section: football. Gyula Balázs became the president, and the first half-season; he was the adult-team's manager too. They started in the II/a division of district Kaposvár, and they reached the silver medal up front. Next year, they reached 3rd place, so they could play an internacional friendly with yugoslavian NK Kutina. In 1991, they get a promising sponsor too, ÖKM, an adult magazine published in Austria. The magazine wanted a football team, to make they product popular in Hungary too. A lot of local entrepreneur stand behind the team too, so financially they could build a very strong team. The big breakthrough was waited till 1994, because a businessman, István Szalai started to support the team. They united with Taszári Honvéd Szőnyi SE, which was playing in the Megye I. In 1996, they get up into the 3rd division, NBIII. In 1999., they got into the last 16 in the National Cup. In the group stage, they were in the group of Paksi SE, Videoton FC, and Hévíz FC. They get through with 2 wins and one drawn. They knocked out Jászberény in the best 32, but in the next round, they were knocked out by Germán SE Tápíószentmárton. In those times, the club had more supporters than Rákóczi. In 1999, the entrepreneurs walked out, and they gave the NBIII place to Kaposvölgye VSC. The club has started the new season in the right of Kaposfüred II in the district II. The club was renamed, the new name was "Kaposfüred Sport Club". Since those times, Kaposfüred is commuting inside Megye II and Megye III, but they have one of the best youth configuration in the Megye I/II/III. In 2015, Gyula Balázs died, Péter Vincze became the new chairman.

Kaposfüredi Párducok

Since 2014., the club has a women's football team too, named 'Kaposfüredi Párducok'.

List of managers

1987; 1990–1996 Gyula Balázs

1987–1988 Vilmos Vörös

1988–1989 János Horváth

1996–1997 Viktor Petrók

1997–2000 Jenő Baksa

2000–2003 Tamás Törzsök

2003–2005 László Szöts

2005–2007 László Tallián

2007–2009 Zoltán Szentgróti

2009–2013 Zsolt Vejki

2013 Csaba Szabó

2014 Szilveszter Spilák

2014– Gábor Pál

League history

Honours

 Megye I: 1996.
 Megye III: 2000. 2016.

References

Official Website  
2015–16 season statistics in all competitions 

Football clubs in Hungary
1987 establishments in Hungary
Sports clubs in Kaposvár